International Allies FC is a Ghanaian professional football club based in Tema, Greater Accra. They  play in the Ghana Premier League.

History 
The club was founded in October 1996 by Omar Nasser El-Eter, Rabeh Nasser El-Eter and the late Robert Tetteh, a former player for SS74 team of the seventies, Accra Great Olympics and Ghana Black Stars.

In 1997, Inter Allies discovered our first talented player, Michael Coffie who played in the FIFA U-17 World Cup with the Ghana National team, The Black Starlets.

He started the club in the third division league and by the year 2000, the club qualified to play in the second division league.

The club won the second division league title on three occasions, in 2001, we transferred three of our young talented players into the Ghana Premier League and for the second time it had a player play in 2001 FIFA U-20 World Cup in Argentina with the Black Satellites Squad.

In 2005, the club produced three players for 2005 CAF U-17 African Cup of Nations in Gambia namely Jonathan Quartey, Emmanuel Banahene and Solomon Addy that won Ghana the silver medal which automatically qualified Black Starlets for the 2005 FIFA U-17 World Cup in Peru. The above named players are currently still playing for the Ghana national football team.

In 2007, to prove how good the club are at what they do, that is producing young talent, Inter produced another three player for the Black Starlets squad that played in the 2007 CAF U-17 Tournament in Togo namely David Addy, Moses Otiboe and Nathaniel Asamoah.

In the 2007/2008 Ghana Premier League season, Inter had seven players currently playing namely Emmanuel Banahene (Kpando Heart of Lions), Samuel Ayew Yeboah and Isaac Amponsah (Liberty Professionals FC), Nathaniel Asamoah, David Addy and Daniel Coffie (Wa All Stars F.C.) and Simon Martey (Asante Kotoko).

After several years of hard work, they have finally achieved their biggest goal, having David Addy and Emmanuel Banahene in the Senior national team the Black Stars.

The club have in 2008 a player (Dominic Oduro) playing for FC Dallas in the United States. He was scouted while playing for the University of Ghana, Legon by the Virginia Commonwealth University. Inter also have one player, Jonathan Quartey playing for Kaizer Chiefs FC in the South African Premier League.

In January, 2008, the team took part in the 60th Edition of the Torneo Mondiale Di Calcio "Coppa Carnevale" from 28 January – 11 February. In the 2012/2013 season, six players left the club and joined to bigger teams worldwide Laud Ofosuhene joined to Portuguese Rio Ave F.C., Clifford Aboagye signed with Serie A top club Udinese Calcio, Aminu Abdallah joined to Canadian-based Major League Soccer club Vancouver Whitecaps FC and Fatau Mohammed signed with Swedish lower lige side Vimmerby IF. In June 2013 defeated Danbort FC and qualified first time for the promotion to the Ghana Premier League. The club will host its  home games in the 2013/2014 Ghana Premier League season in the Tema Sports Stadium, because the original home stadium Ho Sports Stadium is too small.

In January 2017 it was announced by the club that home games in the 2016/2017 Ghana Premier League would be played at the El Wak Stadium in Accra. In April 2019, Michel Otou was appointed as club captain, he left the club in 2020 few months before his contract expired.

Match Fixing Scandal 
In July 2021 Inter Allies defender Hashmin Musah has confessed to scoring two intentional own goals in Saturday's Ghana Premier League clash with Ashanti Gold in order to defy an attempt at match-fixing from his own team. The club lost 7–0, with Musah coming off the bench to net twice past his own keeper in the final 12 minutes. He claims that he did so on purpose as he believes that the score had been agreed in advance for betting purposes.

Honours

National 
 Ghanaian FA Cup
 Runners-up (1): 2013–14

Staff

Management 

Chairman
  Omar Nasser El-Eter

Vice chairman
  Rabeh EL-Eter

Chief executive officer
  Delali Eric Senaye

Technical director
  William Klutse

Sports 
Manager    Henrik Lehm
Head coach
  Herber Addo

Current squad 
As of 7 July 2017

Notable players 
These players have famous played during his active career with the club.

 Victorien Adebayor
Michel Otou

Member of the Black Stars 
 David Addy
 Daniel Amartey
 Emmanuel Banahene
 Jonathan Quartey
 Samuel Yeboah
 Joseph Aidoo

Youth national team players 
 Francis Sogbé, played the 2005 FIFA U-17 World Championship
 Kwame Baah (footballer), played the 2015 African U-20 Championship
 Kwame Baah (footballer), played the 2015 FIFA U-20 World Cup

Other national team players 
  Ben Teekloh, 23 games for the Liberia national football team

Top scorers 

 Sheriff Deo Mohammed (9 goals) 2015 season
 Frederick Boateng (9 goals) 2016 season
 Victorien Adebayor (12 goals) 2019–20 season

Reserve 
The club has a Farm team which plays its games in the  Division Two League Greater Accra Regional Football Association Middle League, as part of the Accra Youth Soccer Academy Organisation.

Notes

External links 
 Official Site

Football clubs in Ghana
Football clubs in Accra
Tema
1996 establishments in Ghana
Association football clubs established in 1996